Salmo baliki is a species of trout, a salmonid fish, is described from the Murat River, a drainage of the Euphrates River.

References

baliki
Lake fish of Asia
Fish described in 2021